The 6th Infantry Division (6-ya Pekhotnaya Diviziya) was an infantry formation of the Russian Imperial Army that existed in various formations from 1806 until the end of World War I and the Russian Revolution. From before 1903 to the end of its existence the division was based in Ostrov.

History 
The division fought in World War I and distinguished itself in battle against the Austro-Hungarian 4th Army in 1915.  It was demobilized around the time of the Russian Revolution and the subsequent unrest.

Organization 
It was part of the 15th Army Corps as of 1914.
1st Brigade 
 21st Murom Infantry Regiment
 22nd Nizhny Novgorod Infantry Regiment
2nd Brigade 
23rd General Field Marshal Count Saltykov's Nizovsky Infantry Regiment
24th General Neverovsky's Simbirsk Infantry Regiment
6th Artillery Brigade

Commanders
1900–1903: Mikhail Zasulich

References 

Infantry divisions of the Russian Empire
Military units and formations established in 1806
Military units and formations disestablished in 1918
Łomża Governorate